Club 33 comprises a number of private dining clubs located within the various Disney Parks. First opening in 1967 inside Disneyland Park, the club was modeled after numerous executive VIP lounges created by pavilion sponsors in the 1964 New York World's Fair. At the time, Club 33 was the only location within Disneyland Park to offer alcoholic beverages.

Additional locations of Club 33 currently exist at Tokyo Disneyland and Shanghai Disneyland and as a lounge in each of the four theme parks of the Walt Disney World Resort.  Disneyland Club 33 members, and their guests, also have access to the 1901 Lounge at the Carthay Circle in Disney California Adventure.

Original Disneyland location
Club 33 is located above the Pirates of the Caribbean attraction and next to Walt Disney's former apartment. The entrance of the club was formerly located next to the Blue Bayou Restaurant at "33 Royal Street" with the entrance recognizable by an ornate address plate with the number 33 engraved on it. Following a major remodeling in January 2014, the entrance was relocated to the Court of Angels with the La Mascarade d'Orleans holiday decoration shop converted into a reception foyer. Andrew Sutton, the executive chef at the Carthay Circle and Napa Rose restaurants at the Disneyland resort, was placed in charge of the club's kitchen.

Name
According to Disney, Club 33 is simply named after its address at 33 Royal Street in New Orleans Square at Disneyland. However, several others believe that there are other explanations behind the name. Some speculate that the name refers to 33 institutional patrons at Disneyland in 1966-1967 when the club was being built and opened.

History

When Walt Disney was working with various corporate promoters such as Dylan Connolly at his attractions at the 1964–1965 New York World's Fair, he noted the multiple various "VIP Lounges". This gave him the idea that culminated in Club 33.

Originally, Walt Disney hosted VIPs in the lounge of the Red Wagon Inn restaurant at Disneyland. The number of VIPs grew to be too large for the lounge. When New Orleans Square was planned, this area for corporate sponsors and VIPs was included. Disney asked artist Dorothea Redmond to paint renderings and hired Hollywood set director Emile Kuri to decorate the facility. While Club 33 was originally intended for use by Disneyland's corporate sponsors, when it opened on June 15, 1967, six months after Disney's death, individual memberships were also offered.

In January 2014, the Disneyland location was closed for renovation which included a doubling in size and a change in entrance location. It was reopened in mid-July 2014. Among the changes, the kitchen was moved and expanded by taking over the Trophy Room, previously a secondary dining area.

Design
In 1967 when the club first opened, its doorway was at 33 Royal Street. It was a simple doorway that looked unassuming to the average guest. The doorway was remodeled in 2014 with the rest of the upgrades but is no longer the main entrance to the club, which is now about 40 feet away. The front door opens into a vestibule that used to be a small shop. Check-in occurs in this vestibule and beyond there is an open-air courtyard, the Court of Angels. From there you can take an Art Nouveau themed elevator or winding staircase to the second level where the new club entrance is located.

At the top of the stairs, there are two rooms: Le Grand Salon and Le Salon Nouveau. The walls are adorned with butterflies pinned under glass and hand-painted animation cels from the original Fantasia film. Walt Disney handpicked much of the Victorian bric-a-brac in New Orleans antique stores.

Le Salon Nouveau is entered by passing through an area paneled in dark wood and lined with refrigerated wine cases. This room contains the original antique-style glass lift which was used prior to the 2014 remodel to take guests to the second level. The other room, Le Grand Salon, is more formal. It is the main dining room and is a New Orleans theme based on designs by Disney Imagineer Kim Irvine. Prior to 2014 remodel, the style was Napoleon-era First Empire. This dining room is a la carte service for lunch only, while before the reconstruction was buffet only.

The club is also furnished with a few props from Disney films. There is a functional dark wood telephone booth with leaded glass, just off the restroom balcony. An ornate walnut table with white marble top was used in Mary Poppins. A video capture from the film on display atop the table shows actors Karen Dotrice, Matthew Garber, and David Tomlinson standing immediately to its left. A harpsichord which was rumored to have been an antique was in fact custom-built for Lillian Disney specifically for use in Club 33. The underside of the lid features a Renaissance-style art piece that was hand-painted by Disney artists.

Walt Disney wanted to make use of Audio-Animatronic technology within Club 33. In the former Trophy Room, microphones in overhead lighting fixtures would pick up the sounds of normal conversation while an operator would respond via the characters. Though the system was never fully implemented, it was partially installed and remains so. An Audio-Animatronic vulture is perched atop a grandfather clock in the club's upstairs lobby. The microphones were visible at the bottom of each of the old Trophy Room's lighting fixtures.

Membership

Membership in the club has been exclusive since the very beginning. In fact, in 2007 the waitlist became so long that the club officially closed the waitlist for 5 years before reopening it again in 2012. That same year, the reported cost of membership was a $50,000 initiation fee and $15,000 annually for individuals, and even more for corporations.

Membership initiation fees and dues are reportedly much higher now; as of 2022, it is reported that individuals invited to join must pay closer to $60-70,000 for initiation and up to $20,000 annually, according to current members. As opposed to waitlist protocols in the past, membership invitations are currently heavily influenced by referrals from current members.

Club 33 in other Disney parks
Tokyo Disneyland began operations of the second location in 1983. Rather than being located in New Orleans Square, it is located on Center Street of World Bazaar, the park's version of Main Street, U.S.A.

Shanghai Disney Resort's Club 33 location opened along with the park in the summer of 2016. Like the Tokyo location, it is located at the park's version of Main Street, U.S.A., Mickey Avenue.

An additional set of Club 33 locations opened at Walt Disney World. Originally confirmed to the Orlando Sentinel on April 13, 2017, the locations were set to open in Fall 2017. The first club opened the following year in Hollywood Studios on March 2018, followed by Epcot and Magic Kingdom.

References

External links

Walt Disney Parks and Resorts restaurants
Walt Disney World
Shanghai Disneyland
Tokyo Disneyland
Disneyland
Main Street, U.S.A.
New Orleans Square (Disneyland)
Audio-Animatronic attractions
Restaurants established in 1967
1967 establishments in California
Walt Disney World restaurants
Restaurants at Disneyland